NGC 4100 is a spiral galaxy in the northern constellation of Ursa Major. It was discovered by William Herschel on Mar 9, 1788. This galaxy is a member of the NGC 3992 group in the Ursa Major Cluster.

Gallery

References

External links
 

Ursa Major (constellation)
Astronomical objects discovered in 1788
Unbarred spiral galaxies
Discoveries by William Herschel
4100
M109 Group
038370